The Gilmer County School District is a public school district in Gilmer County, Georgia, United States, based in Ellijay. It serves the communities of East Ellijay and Ellijay.

Schools
The Gilmer County School District has three elementary schools, one middle school, and one high school.

Elementary schools 
Ellijay Elementary School
Clear Creek Elementary School
Mountain View Elementary School

Middle schools 
Clear Creek Middle School

High school 
Gilmer High School

References

External links
 
 Oakland Academy historical marker

School districts in Georgia (U.S. state)
Education in Gilmer County, Georgia